The Bandits of the Rio Grande (German: Die Banditen vom Rio Grande) is a 1965 West German western film directed by Helmuth M. Backhaus and starring Harald Leipnitz, Maria Perschy and Wolfgang Kieling.

The film's sets were designed by the art director Nino Borghi. It was shot on location around Yugoslavia and in studios in Belgrade. It failed to recover its production costs at the box office, leading to the closure of its production company Piran-Film soon afterwards.

Cast
 Harald Leipnitz as Ryan 
 Maria Perschy as Helen 
 Wolfgang Kieling as Barran 
 Gerlinde Locker as Joan 
 Demeter Bitenc as Elgaut
 Uli Steigberg as Bill 
 Rolf Arndt as Thouniak 
 Laci Cigoj as Cardo 
 Ellen Schwiers as Lida

References

Bibliography 
 Peter W. Schulze, Thomas Klein & Ivo Ritze. Crossing Frontiers: Intercultural Perspectives on the Western. Schüren Verlag, 2015.

External links 
 

1965 films
1965 Western (genre) films
German Western (genre) films
West German films
1960s German-language films
Films directed by Helmuth M. Backhaus
Films set in Mexico
Films about kidnapping
Films about outlaws
1960s German films